Five Daughters Bakery is a family owned bakery with 6 locations (Tennessee, Georgia and Florida) owned by Isaac and Stephanie Meek. Founded in 2015, the bakery is known for making donuts. They are known for making the 100-layer doughnut which takes three days to make. The signature donut is a cross between a donut and a croissant: a cronut.

Company details
The bakery was started in the couple's Franklin Tennessee home and named after the Meek family's five daughters: Dylan, Lucy, Maggie, Evangeline, and Constance. The bakery uses organic ingredients and grape seed oil for frying. The company became nationally renowned for the three-inch thick 100 Layer Donut. Many celebrities have expressed their infatuation with the donut. 

In 2018, the company opened a location in Atlanta, Georgia. In 2019, the company  opened a second location in Georgia and several in Florida.

See also
 List of bakery cafés
 List of fried dough foods
 List of doughnut shops
 List of doughnut varieties
 National Doughnut Day

References

External links

Video story of Five Daughters Bakery

American companies established in 2015
Food manufacturers of the United States
Bakeries of the United States
Regional restaurant chains in the United States
Restaurants established in 2015
Doughnut shops in the United States